The politics of Jiangxi Province in the People's Republic of China is structured in a dual party-government system like all other governing institutions in mainland China.

The Governor of Jiangxi is the highest-ranking official in the People's Government of Jiangxi. However, in the province's dual party-government governing system, the Governor has less power than the Jiangxi Chinese Communist Party (CCP) Provincial Committee Secretary, colloquially termed the "Jiangxi CCP Party Chief".

List of Jiangxi CCP Party secretaries

Chen Zhengren: 1949–1952
Yang Shangkui: 1952–1967
Cheng Shiqing: 1968–1972
Jiang Weiqing: 1974–1982
Bai Dongcai: 1982–1985
Wan Shaofen: 1985–1988
Mao Zhiyong: 1988–1995
Wu Guanzheng: 1995–1997
Shu Huiguo: 1997–2001
Meng Jianzhu: 2001–2007
Su Rong: 2007–2013
Qiang Wei: 2013–2016
Lu Xinshe: 2016–2018
Liu Qi: 2018 – 2021
Yi Lianhong(): 2021 - 2022
Yin Hong(): 2022- present

List of the governors of Jiangxi
The Governor is the second highest-ranking official in Jiangxi after the CCP Party Secretary. The governor is responsible for all provincial matters related to economics, personnel, the environment, politics and foreign policy.

Shao Shiping: 1949–1965
Fang Zhichun: 1965–1967
Cheng Shiqing: 1968–1972
She Jide: 1972–1974
Jiang Weiqing: 1974–1979
Bai Dongcai: 1979–1982
Zhao Zengyi: 1982–1985
Ni Xiance: 1985–1986
Wu Guanzheng: 1986–1995
Shu Shengyou: 1995–2001
Huang Zhiquan: 2001–2007
Wu Xinxiong: January 2007 – June 2011
Lu Xinshe: June 2011 – July 2016
Liu Qi: July 2016 – August 2018
Yi Lianhong: August 2018 – October 2021
Ye Jianchun():October 2021 - present

List of chairmen of Jiangxi People's Congress
Yang Shangkui: 1979–1983
Ma Jikong: 1983–1985
Wang Shufeng: 1985–1988
Xu Qin: 1988–1993
Mao Zhiyong: 1993–1998
Shu Huiguo: 1998–2001
Meng Jianzhu: 2001–2008
Su Rong: 2008–2013
Qiang Wei: 2013–2016
Lu Xinshe: 2016–2018
Liu Qi: 2018 – 2022
Yi Lianhong: 2022 - present

List of chairmen of CPPCC Jiangxi Committee
Yang Shangkui: 1955-1967, 1978–1979
Fang Zhichun: 1979–1983
Wu Ping: 1983–1993
Liu Fangren: 1993–1994
Zhu Zhihong: 1994–2003
Zhong Qihuang: 2003–2007
Fu Kecheng: 2007–2012
Zhang Yijiong: 2012
Huang Yuejin: 2012–2018
Yao Zengke: 2018-

References

Jiangxi
Jiangxi
Jiangxi